Sambucus racemosa is a species of elderberry known by the common names red elderberry and red-berried elder.

Distribution and habitat
It is native to Europe, northern temperate Asia, and North America across Canada and the United States. It grows in riparian environments, woodlands, and other habitats, generally in moist areas.

Description
The stems are soft with a pithy center.

The leaflets have a strong disagreeable odor when crushed.

The inflorescence is a vaguely cone-shaped panicle of several cymes of flowers blooming from the ends of stem branches. The flower buds are pink when closed, and the open flowers are white, cream, or yellowish. Each flower has small, recurved petals and a star-shaped axis of five white stamens tipped in yellow anthers. The flowers are fragrant and visited by hummingbirds and butterflies.

The fruit is a bright red or sometimes purple drupe containing 3 to 5 seeds.

Varieties and subspecies
Sambucus racemosa subsp. kamtschatica — red elder, native to Northeastern Asia.
Sambucus racemosa var. melanocarpa — Rocky Mountain elder, native to the Western United States and Western Canada, including the Rocky Mountains and Sierra Nevada.
Sambucus racemosa var. microbotrys (Rydb.) Kearney & Peebles – Southwestern United States
Sambucus racemosa subsp. pubens — American red elder, native to Eastern North America
Sambucus racemosa subsp. racemosa — European red elder.
Sambucus racemosa  var. racemosa — Pacific red elderberry.
Sambucus racemosa subsp. sibirica — red elder, native to Siberia.
Sambucus racemosa subsp. sieboldiana — Japanese red elder

Uses
The stems, roots and foliage are poisonous, and the berries can be toxic or cause nausea if eaten raw.

Medicinal plant
It has been used as a traditional medicinal plant by Native Americans, including the Bella Coola, Carrier, Gitksan, Hesquiaht, Menominee, Northern Paiute, Ojibwa, Paiute, Potawatomi, Tlingit, and Haida peoples. The uses included as an emetic, antidiarrheal, cold and cough remedy, dermatological and gynecological aid, and a hemostat.

Food
The fruits are reportedly safe to eat when cooked, but are potentially poisonous when raw. They were cooked in a variety of recipes by indigenous peoples, including by the Apache, Bella Coola, Gitxsan, Gosiute, Makah, Ojibwa, Quileute, Skokomish, Yurok peoples.

The fruits are popular with birds, who also distribute the seeds. The flowers attract butterflies and hummingbirds.

Cultivation
Sambucus racemosa is cultivated as an ornamental plant, for use as a shrub or small tree in traditional and wildlife gardens, and natural landscape design projects.

Cultivars
Cultivars in the nursery trade include:
Sambucus racemosa 'Black Lace' — burgundy foliage
Sambucus racemosa 'Lemon Lace' — golden yellow and green foliage
Sambucus racemosa 'Lemony Lace' — golden green foliage, with red new growth
Sambucus racemosa 'Sutherland Gold' — green foliage, with bronze new growth: it has received the Royal Horticultural Society's Award of Garden Merit.

Images

References

External links

 
 
 
 

racemosa
Flora of Europe
Flora of temperate Asia
Flora of Canada
Flora of the Eastern United States
Flora of the Western United States
Flora of California
Plants described in 1753
Taxa named by Carl Linnaeus
Berries
Bird food plants
Butterfly food plants
Edible plants
Garden plants
Flora without expected TNC conservation status